11β-Hydroxyandrostenedione (11β-OHA4), also known as 11β-hydroxyandrost-4-ene-3,17-dione, is an endogenous, naturally occurring steroid and androgen prohormone that is produced primarily, if not exclusively, in the adrenal glands. It is closely related to adrenosterone (11-ketoandrostenedione; 11-KA4), 11-ketotestosterone (11-KT), and 11-ketodihydrotestosterone (11-KDHT), which are also produced in the adrenal glands.

It can be used as a biomarker for guiding primary aldosteronism subtyping in adrenal vein sampling where blood samples are taken from both adrenal glands to compare the amount of hormone made by each gland.

See also
 4-Androstenedione

References

Androgens and anabolic steroids
Androstanes
Biomarkers
Hormones of the suprarenal cortex
Ketones
Secondary alcohols
Sex hormones
Steroid hormones